A.D.D. (Audio Day Dream) is the debut studio album by Blake Lewis, the runner-up on the sixth season of American Idol. It was released in the United States and Canada on December 4, 2007. The first single is "Break Anotha" and was released to radio on October 30. The album did not leak as other artists' albums generally do, instead appeared in full first within the "Free Full CD Listening Parties" section on AOL.com on December 3, the day before the release.

Background 
On June 21, 2007, Lewis disclosed in his blog at MySpace that on top of the American Idol tour, he has "been in meetings with producers and writers" for his album, though his record deal with Arista Records/19 Recordings was not announced officially until August 24. He started to record his album in the studio "for all night long" from June 18 and co-wrote 12 songs out of 13 tracks (excluding the interludes) on Audio Day Dream.

An exclusive version of Audio Day Dream with a 17-minute documentary, which was shot by Ethan Newberry and Cisco McCarthy, Lewis' friends, is offered as a bonus video download by Wal-Mart with purchase of their specially marked CD. Another special edition of the album, which is tied with a bonus track called "Human", is available on iTunes Store. A trailer of A.D.D. was published on BlakeLewisComingSoon.com right before the leak of "Break Anotha".

Musical influences 
Lewis has stated in several interviews that he wanted his future album to have pop, electronic and jazzy hip hop feels to it, as he classified the sound as "electro-funk-soul-pop". He has also listed his ideal choices of producers and collaborators for his album in various interviews, including "Father of Trance" BT, Darkchild, will.i.am, Pro J, DJ Shadow, Dan the Automator and Gnarls Barkley. In interviews with Entertainment Weekly and Entertainment Tonight, he mentioned a collaboration with Doug E. Fresh, the hip hop/beatboxing legend Lewis beatboxed with to "The Show" in the Grand Finale of the sixth season of American Idol and received a standing ovation from the judges and the audience, as well as some of his musical influences, such as Maroon 5, 311, Duran Duran, Michael Jackson and Jamiroquai.

Lewis described some of the songs he has recorded on July 16, 2007:

The singer gave another depiction of A.D.D. in the official press announcing its release:

Critical reception 

The album was met with mixed reviews. AllMusic called the album "ADD is certainly one of the more interesting AmIdol-related records, but so much commotion without construction is ultimately as forgettable as Jordin's pageant-winner trifle, and perhaps a little more tiring to get through, too." Entertainment Weekly gave the album a "C" and wrote "If Lewis could just find a way to integrate all his early-MTV influences (A Flock of Fat Boys?), well...that album wouldn't be great either--though it'd be less forgettable than this exercise in pop adequacy."

Other critics praised the album. Billboard titled its review "American Idol" season six runner-up Blake Lewis' debut, "ADD: Audio Day Dream," is indeed a little all over the map, but, surprisingly, it works." Los Angeles Times was quite impressed stating "His singing on "Audio Day Dream" is fine; it gets the job done. Yet what arrests your ear are Lewis' ideas."

Chart performance 
In its first week of release, Audio Day Dream sold about 97,500 copies, debuting at number ten on the Billboard 200, the same spot where fellow American Idol Jordin Sparks debuted (although Jordin's sales were better on her debut week), and number three on the Billboard Digital Albums Chart  It has sold 308,000 as of July 1, 2009.

Track listing

Notes
 signifies a vocal producer
 signifies an additional producer

Release history

References 

2007 albums
Blake Lewis albums
Arista Records albums
Albums produced by Mike Elizondo
Albums produced by Rico Love
Albums produced by Ryan Tedder
Albums produced by Sam Watters
Albums produced by S*A*M and Sluggo
19 Recordings albums